Alan Gilmour (18 November 1911 – 1 September 1962) was an Australian rules footballer who played for the South Melbourne Football Club in the Victorian Football League (VFL).

Family
The son of William Harold Gilmour (1876–1957), and Annie Elizabeth Gilmour (1879–1958), née Jewell, Alan Gilmour was born at South Melbourne on 18 November 1911.

He married Joan Lytton Reed (1913–2007) on 17 July 1937.

Football

Elsternwick (MAFA)
While playing with the Elsternwick Football Club in the Metropolitan Amateur Football Association (MAFA) he was selected in the Victorian (MAFA) 1931 representative side to play against the South Australian (SAAFL) side, at the M.C.G., on 8 June 1931, and in the MAFA 1932 representative side to play against the SAAFL side, at the Norwood Oval, on 6 June 1932.

South Melbourne (VFL)
On the training list at South Melbourne for the 1932 season, he played a number of games in the Second XVIII, and played his first senior game, on the half-back flank, against Melbourne, at the MCG, on 23 July 1932, as a last-miniute replacement for the injured Hugh McLaughlin.

Gilmour, a printer/compositor by trade, retired from VFL football in 1934, having served his apprenticeship at The Emerald Hill Record, and having gained employment with The Argus newspaper.

Death
He died at Brighton East, Victoria on 1 September 1962.

Notes

References
 
 World War Two Nominal Roll: Private Alan Gilmour (VX43145), Department of Veterans' Affairs.
 World War Two Nominal Roll: Leading Aircraftsman Alan Gilmour (53176), Department of Veterans' Affairs.

External links 

1911 births
1962 deaths
Australian rules footballers from Melbourne
Sydney Swans players
People from South Melbourne
Australian printers